Mooz-lum is a 2011 American independent film written and directed by Qasim "Q" Basir and stars Danny Glover, Nia Long, and Evan Ross. Mooz-lum (i.e. "Muslim") tells the story of an African American Muslim family whose lives are changed by the September 11 attacks and their aftermath. The film was initially promoted primarily through social media, before opening for its limited theatrical release on February 11, 2011.

Cast
 Evan Ross as Tariq Mahdi
 Nia Long as Safiq
 Danny Glover as Dean Francis
 Roger Guenveur Smith as Hassan Mahdi
Azhar Usman as Brother Hussein

Plot
Amid a strict Muslim rearing and a social life he has never had, Tariq Mahdi (Evan Ross) enters college confused.

New peers, family and mentors help him find his place, but the 9/11 attacks force him to face his past and make the biggest decisions of his life.

Filming
The movie was filmed in Southeastern Michigan. Although the college attended by Tariq is never explicitly identified, most of the college scenes were filmed on location on the campuses of the University of Michigan and Eastern Michigan University. The mosque scene was filmed at the Islamic Center of America in Dearborn, Michigan.

Reception
As of January 14, 2015, Mooz-lum has received an overall rating of 78% from all critics (7 fresh and 2 rotten) at Rotten Tomatoes. Film critic Omer Mozaffar calls the film "a long awaited breath of fresh air." at RogerEbert.com.

Awards and honors
14th Annual Urbanworld Film Festival 2010—Best Narrative Feature
Chicago International Film Festival 2010—Official Selection
34th Cairo International Film Festival—Official Selection

See also
List of cultural references to the September 11 attacks
List of black films of the 2010s

Notes

Further reading
 Basir, Qasim. "I Am a Muslimerican". The Huffington Post, August 19, 2010.
 "Film 'Mooz-lum' Confronts Public Perceptions of Islam", Tell Me More, National Public Radio, September 20, 2010.
 ""Mooz-lum": faith flourishing in freedom" - Contending Modernities, February 17, 2011.

External links 
 
 
 https://www.facebook.com/Moozlumthemovie

2010 films
Films based on the September 11 attacks
Films about Islam
2010s English-language films
American independent films
African-American films
American drama films
2010s American films